The De Baca County Courthouse, located on Ave. C in Fort Sumner, New Mexico within De Baca County, is a historic building built in 1930.  It was designed by architects Kerr & Walsh and includes Colonial Revival and, more specifically, Georgian Revival architecture.  The building was listed on the National Register of Historic Places (NRHP) in 1987.

It is one of 14 New Mexico county courthouses that were reviewed for their historical significance in 1987;  the county courthouse of Dona Ana County, was the first and only other Georgian Revival style county courthouse within the state.

See also

National Register of Historic Places listings in De Baca County, New Mexico

References

Courthouses in New Mexico
Government buildings completed in 1930
De Baca County, New Mexico
Courthouses on the National Register of Historic Places in New Mexico
1930s architecture in the United States
Georgian Revival architecture in New Mexico
National Register of Historic Places in De Baca County, New Mexico
County courthouses in New Mexico